Cutter to Houston is an American medical drama starring Shelley Hack, Jim Metzler, and Alec Baldwin that aired on CBS on Saturday night from October 1 to December 31, 1983 at 8 p.m Eastern time. The series was created by Sandor Stern.

Synopsis
Cutter to Houston is set at Cutter Community Hospital in the small town of Cutter, Texas, sixty miles from Houston. The series stars Shelley Hack as surgeon Dr. Beth Gilbert, Jim Metzler as Dr. Andy Fenton, and Alec Baldwin as Dr. Hal Wexler, a GP under probation for writing illegal prescriptions.

Cutter to Houston aired on Saturdays at 8:00 PM Eastern. Due to low ratings, it was canceled after seven episodes and was replaced by Whiz Kids.

Cast 
Jim Metzler as Dr. Andy Fenton
Shelley Hack as Dr. Beth Gilbert
Alec Baldwin as Dr. Hal Wexler
K Callan as Connie Buford
Noble Willingham as Mayor Warren Jarvis
Susan Styles as Nurse Patty Alvarez

Notable guest appearance
In a 1983 episode, Chad Allen, then 9 years of age, "played a kid who got hurt and had to be given mouth-to-mouth and carried to the waiting chopper by Dr. Hal Wexler." Years later, Chad reminisced that "I thought it was the greatest job I had ever gotten," because Alec Baldwin was Dr. Wexler.

US television ratings

Episodes

References

External links
 
 

1983 American television series debuts
1983 American television series endings
1980s American drama television series
1980s American medical television series
CBS original programming
English-language television shows
Television series by MGM Television
Television shows set in Houston